God Hand is a 2006 video game.

God hand or God's hand may also refer to:
 Ken "Godhand" Mishima, a character from Ehrgeiz
 God Hand, a character class in Dragon Warrior VII
 Gods Hand, a 2008 album by Axe Murder Boyz
 God's Hand, a 2015 album by Hot Sugar
 CG 4, a star-forming region commonly referred to as "God's Hand"
 The God Hand, a group of five demigods in the manga Berserk

See also
 Hand of God (disambiguation)